Taypi Kunka (Aymara taypi center, middle, kunka throat, throat, gullet, neck, "central throat", Hispanicized spelling Taypicunca) is a mountain in the Andes of Peru, about  high. It is located in the Puno Region, Carabaya Province, Crucero District. Taypi Kunka lies at a lake named Wiluyuq Qucha, northwest of Apachita and northeast of Pinkilluni Urqu.

References 

Mountains of Puno Region
Mountains of Peru